Licht is a German and Yiddish surname meaning "light". The surname is also an ornamental surname within Jewish communities (Yiddish: ליכט) with the same meaning. Notable people with the surname include:

Alan Licht (born 1968), American guitarist
Aleksandar Licht (1884–1948), Croatian Zionist leader
Chris Licht, American television producer
Frank Licht (1916–1987), 67th Governor of Rhode Island from 1969 to 1973
Hugo Licht (1841–1923), German architect
Jason Licht (born 1971), General Manager for the Tampa Bay Buccaneers of the National Football League
Judy Licht, American television and print journalist
Lucas Licht (born 1981), Argentinian-Israeli football player
Roger Licht, former chairman of the California Horse Racing Board and horse racing legal expert
Sascha Licht (born 1974), German former footballer
Sonja Licht (born 1947), Serbian sociologist and political activist

German-language surnames